The Venus of Petřkovice ( or Landecká venuše) is a pre-historic Venus figurine, a mineral statuette of a nude female figure, dated to about 23,000 BCE (Gravettian industry) in what is today the Czech Republic.

Discovery
It was found within the current city limits of Ostrava (Ostrava-Petřkovice), Silesia, in the Czech Republic, by archaeologist Bohuslav Klíma on 14 July 1953. It was beneath a mammoth molar at an ancient settlement of mammoth hunters. Many stone artifacts and skeletal fragments were also found nearby.

Features
The statue measures 4.5 x 1.5 x 1.4 cm and is a headless torso of a woman carved from iron ore (hematite). Uniquely, the absence of the head appears to be the author's intention. Also, unlike other prehistoric Venus figurines, it shows a slender young woman or girl with small breasts.

Location
It is now in the Archeological Institute, Brno, but between 7 February - 26 May 2013 it was displayed in the exhibition Ice Age Art: Arrival of the Modern Mind, at the British Museum in London.

See also

Art of the Upper Paleolithic
List of Stone Age art

References

External links 
 
 The Institute of Archeology of the Academy of Sciences of the Czech Republic, Brno

Archaeological discoveries in the Czech Republic
Archaeological discoveries in Europe
European archaeology
Gravettian
History of Silesia
Nude sculptures
Ostrava
Petrkovice
Prehistory of the Czech lands
Sculptures of women in the Czech Republic
Statues in the Czech Republic